is a Japanese novelist. He is from the Hokkaido Prefecture, however currently resides in Tokyo.

Career 
In 2007, he debuted with the first volume of the  series after it won the 1st Shogakukan Light Novel Awards.

In 2011, his series  began publishing. The same year, his novel Koi no Cupid wa Handgun o Buppanasu (恋のキューピッドはハンドガンをぶっ放す。) was published.

Black Bullet received an anime adaptation in 2014.

Works 

  (Illustrated by kyo, published by Gagaga Bunko, 6 volumes, 2007 –)
  (Illustrated by Saki Ukai, published by Dengeki Bunko, 7 volumes, 2011 –)
 Koi no Cupid wa Handgun o Buppanasu (恋のキューピッドはハンドガンをぶっ放す。)  (Illustrated by aki, published by Gagaga Bunko, 2011)

References

External links 

 午前四時起きのライターズハイ  - Blog
 

Living people
1985 births
People from Hokkaido
Japanese science fiction writers
Japanese mystery writers
Japanese novelists
Light novelists